Korea Gas Corporation (KOGAS) is a South Korean public natural gas company that was established by the Korean government in 1983. KOGAS has grown into the largest LNG-importing company in the world and operates four LNG regasification terminals and 4,945 km of natural gas pipelines in South Korea.

The company has a stake in the Prelude floating liquefied natural gas facility in Australia, along with investors Shell, Inpex Corporation, and CPC Corporation. It is the largest floating production structure in the world. Production started in December 2018.

See also
Daegu KOGAS Pegasus

References

External links

Official page
Yahoo! Finance page for 036460.KS

Natural gas companies of South Korea
Natural gas pipeline companies
Energy companies established in 1983
Non-renewable resource companies established in 1983
Companies listed on the Korea Exchange
Companies based in Daegu
Government-owned companies of South Korea